Front Row may refer to:

 Front Row (software), media center software for Apple's Mac computers
 Front Row (radio programme), a British arts programme broadcast on BBC Radio 4
 Front Row (TV program), a Philippine documentary television program broadcast on GMA Network
 Front Row Channel, an international digital channel
 Front Row (album), a 1982 album by David Meece
 "Front Row", an Alanis Morissette song from her 1998 album Supposed Former Infatuation Junkie
 The three-player formation at the front of a rugby scrum

See also 
 Front Row Center, a TV series aired on the DuMont Television Network from 1949 to 1950
 Front Row Club Issue 1, a 1998 live album by British rock group Marillion
 Front Row Motorsports, a team that competes on NASCAR Sprint Cup circuit